Adam Johnson may refer to:

 Adam Johnson (baseball) (born 1979), American baseball player
 Adam Johnson (conductor), British classical pianist and conductor
 Adam Johnson (cricketer) (born 1978), English cricketer
 Adam Johnson (footballer) (born 1987), English footballer and convicted sex offender
 Adam Johnson (ice hockey) (born 1994), American ice hockey player
 Adam Johnson (musician), American musician, sound designer and visual artist
 Adam Johnson (writer) (born 1967), American author
 Adam R. Johnson, state congressman in the Arkansas House of Representatives
 Stovepipe Johnson (Adam Rankin Johnson, 1834–1922), brigadier general of the Confederate States of America